The 1973 USLTA Indoor Circuit  was a professional tennis circuit held in the United States from January until March that year. It consisted of 13 tournaments and was organized by Bill Riordan and sanctioned by the United States Lawn Tennis Association (USLTA).

Schedule

January

February

March

Prize money standings

See also
1973 Grand Prix circuit
1973 World Championship Tennis circuit

References

External links
 1973 ATP tournament schedule

Defunct tennis tournaments in the United States
USLTA Indoor Circuit
USLTA Indoor Circuit seasons